The Pavia–Stradella railway is a railway line in Lombardy, Italy. It was opened in 1882

See also 
 List of railway lines in Italy

References

Footnotes

Sources
 
 

Railway lines in Lombardy
Railway lines opened in 1882